Turritella lindae is a species of sea snail, a marine gastropod mollusk in the family Turritellidae.

Description
Original description: "Shell elongated, average size and shape for subgenus Torcula; whorls ornamented with 5 large cords with numerous fine threads in between; anteriormost 3 cords larger, intersected by large vertical ribs; 12 ribs per whorl on holotype, suture slightly keeled; 
protoconch comprising 3 whorls; protoconch and early whorls bright purple in color; shell color white with scattered fine purple and brown dots."

Distribution
Locus typicus: "(Dredged from) 150 metres depth,
50 kilometres South of Apalachicola, Florida, USA."

References

Turritellidae
Gastropods described in 1987